Alfred Tonna (born 31 May 1950) is a Maltese former cyclist. He competed at the 1972 Summer Olympics and the 1980 Summer Olympics.

References

External links
 

1950 births
Living people
Maltese male cyclists
Olympic cyclists of Malta
Cyclists at the 1972 Summer Olympics
Cyclists at the 1980 Summer Olympics
Place of birth missing (living people)